Bethany Charlotte Firth,  (born 14 February 1996) is a Northern Irish swimmer. Since 2014 she has competed for Great Britain; previously, Firth had represented Ireland. A six time Paralympic gold medalist, she has won gold in her specialist event - the 100 metres backstroke - for both Ireland at the 2012 Summer Paralympics and Great Britain at the 2016 and 2020 Summer Paralympics. These were in addition to the Mixed 4 x 100 metres freestyle relay S14 at the 2020 Games, and 200 metres medley and 200 metres freestyle for Great Britain at the 2016 Games, where she was the nation's most successful Paralympian with three golds and a silver medal. She competes in the S14 classification for athletes with an intellectual impairment.

Personal life
Bethany Charlotte Firth was born on 14 February 1996 in Seaforde, County Down, Northern Ireland. Her father Peter is a teacher and former church minister, and her mother Lindsey is a nurse practitioner. She is a Christian and is a member of Christian Fellowship Church. Firth was educated at Longstone School in Dundonald.

Firth has a learning difficulty that causes short term memory loss. She therefore competes in the S14 classification.

Swimming career
On 31 August 2012, Firth, competing for Ireland in her first Paralympics, won a gold medal at the 2012 Paralympic games in London in the S14 100 metres backstroke final while representing Ireland. Firth, who has learning difficulties, had been swimming for only three years.

Firth won three silver medals at the 2013 IPC Swimming World Championships.

Later in the same year she announced her intention to switch national team and swim for Team GB instead of Ireland after serving a period out of competition, as "Team GB has other S14 swimmers – who have learning disabilities – with whom she can relate." The following year she represented Northern Ireland in the 2014 Commonwealth Games, competing in seven events against non-disabled athletes.

In March 2015 Firth broke the world record for the S14 100m breaststroke in qualifying for that year's IPC World Championships. Firth failed to compete in the World Championships after suffering a fractured wrist in training just a few days before the competition.

On 26 April 2016, in the qualifiers for the 2016 Summer Paralympics in Rio, Firth set a new world record in the S14 200 metres freestyle. Competing at the British Para-International meet in Glasgow, she recorded a time of 2:03.70.

On 8 September 2016, Firth defended the title that she had won in 2012 in the S14 100m backstroke, for the 2016 Summer Paralympics at Rio de Janeiro. She did this, winning in a world record time of 1:04.05 whilst competing for Paralympics GB. She also won gold in the women's 200m freestyle S14, and the women's 200m individual medley SM14, and silver in the women's 100m breaststroke SB14.

At the 2020 Tokyo Paralympics, Firth defended her title in the 100m backstroke S14 and also won gold in the mixed 4 x 100m freestyle relay S14. In addition, she took silver in the women's 200m freestyle S14 and women's 200m individual medley SM14.

Firth was appointed Member of the Order of the British Empire (MBE) in the 2017 New Year Honours for services to swimming and promoted to Officer of the Order of the British Empire (OBE) in the 2022 New Year Honours, also for services to swimming.

She has also received an honorary doctorate from Queen's University Belfast in 2017.

Recognition
She was recognized as one of the BBC's 100 women of 2019.

See also
Ireland at the 2012 Summer Paralympics
2012 Summer Olympics and Paralympics gold post boxes

References

External links 

 
 
 
 
 
 

1996 births
Living people
Female swimmers from Northern Ireland
S14-classified Paralympic swimmers
Paralympic swimmers of Ireland
Paralympic swimmers of Great Britain
Paralympic gold medalists for Ireland
Paralympic gold medalists for Great Britain
Paralympic silver medalists for Great Britain
Paralympic medalists in swimming
Swimmers at the 2012 Summer Paralympics
Swimmers at the 2016 Summer Paralympics
Swimmers at the 2020 Summer Paralympics
Medalists at the 2012 Summer Paralympics
Medalists at the 2016 Summer Paralympics
Medalists at the 2020 Summer Paralympics
Commonwealth Games medallists in swimming
Commonwealth Games gold medallists for Northern Ireland
Swimmers at the 2014 Commonwealth Games
Swimmers at the 2022 Commonwealth Games
Medalists at the World Para Swimming Championships
Medalists at the World Para Swimming European Championships
Officers of the Order of the British Empire
BBC 100 Women
People from County Down
Christians from Northern Ireland
Medallists at the 2022 Commonwealth Games